Taixing Campaign (泰兴战役) was a series of battles fought in the Taixing (泰兴) region in central Jiangsu, and was a clash between the Communists and former Nationalists who fought for the Japanese puppet regime and rejoined the Nationalists after World War II. The campaign was part of the Chinese Civil War in the immediate post-World War II era and resulted in a Communist victory.

Order of battle
Nationalists
Temporarily Organized 19th Division of the 2nd Army
Communists
Units of Central Jiangsu Military Region
Local militias

Campaign
On September 8, 1945, units of communist Central Jiangsu Military Region assisted by local militias decided to take the town of Taixing (泰兴) in central Jiangsu by force after learning that the local defenders consisted of former Nationalists turned Japanese puppet regime force who rejoined the Nationalists after World War II and refused to surrender. Three days later all Nationalist strongholds outside the town had fallen into Communist hands. On the night of September 11 the Communists launched assaults on the town itself, and by 8:00 a.m. Communist forces secured the town after capturing more than 4000 defenders, including the commander, Cai Xinyuan (蔡鑫元). In addition, the Communists captured 12 artillery pieces, over 140 machine guns and more than 2,700 firearms.

See also
List of Battles of Chinese Civil War
National Revolutionary Army
History of the People's Liberation Army
Chinese Civil War

References

Zhu, Zongzhen and Wang, Chaoguang, Liberation War History, 1st Edition, Social Scientific Literary Publishing House in Beijing, 2000,  (set)
Zhang, Ping, History of the Liberation War, 1st Edition, Chinese Youth Publishing House in Beijing, 1987,  (pbk.)
Jie, Lifu, Records of the Liberation War: The Decisive Battle of Two Kinds of Fates, 1st Edition, Hebei People's Publishing House in Shijiazhuang, 1990,  (set)
Literary and Historical Research Committee of the Anhui Committee of the Chinese People's Political Consultative Conference, Liberation War, 1st Edition, Anhui People's Publishing House in Hefei, 1987, 
Li, Zuomin, Heroic Division and Iron Horse: Records of the Liberation War, 1st Edition, Chinese Communist Party History Publishing House in Beijing, 2004, 
Wang, Xingsheng, and Zhang, Jingshan, Chinese Liberation War, 1st Edition, People's Liberation Army Literature and Art Publishing House in Beijing, 2001,  (set)
Huang, Youlan, History of the Chinese People's Liberation War, 1st Edition, Archives Publishing House in Beijing, 1992, 
Liu Wusheng, From Yan'an to Beijing: A Collection of Military Records and Research Publications of Important Campaigns in the Liberation War, 1st Edition, Central Literary Publishing House in Beijing, 1993, 
Tang, Yilu and Bi, Jianzhong, History of Chinese People's Liberation Army in Chinese Liberation War, 1st Edition, Military Scientific Publishing House in Beijing, 1993 – 1997,  (Volum 1), 7800219615 (Volum 2), 7800219631 (Volum 3), 7801370937 (Volum 4), and 7801370953 (Volum 5)

Conflicts in 1945
Campaigns of the Chinese Civil War
1945 in China
Military history of Jiangsu